The 2005 Lombard regional election took place on 3–4 April 2005. The 8th term of the Regional Council was chosen. Roberto Formigoni (Forza Italia) was re-elected for the third time in a row President, defeating Riccardo Sarfatti.

Electoral system
Regional elections in Lombardy were ruled by the "Tatarella law" (approved in 1995), which provided for a mixed electoral system: four fifths of the regional councilors were elected in provincial constituencies by proportional representation, using the largest remainder method with a droop quota and open lists, while the residual votes and the unassigned seats were grouped into a "single regional constituency", where the whole ratios and the highest remainders were divided with the Hare method among the provincial party lists; one fifth of the council seats instead was reserved for regional lists and assigned with a majoritarian system: the leader of the regional list that scored the highest number of votes was elected to the presidency of the Region while the other candidates were elected regional councilors.

A threshold of 3% had been established for the provincial lists, which, however, could still have entered the regional council if the regional list to which they were connected had scored at least 5% of valid votes.

The panachage was also allowed: the voter can indicate a candidate for the presidency but prefer a provincial list connected to another candidate.

Council apportionment
According to the official 2001 Italian census, the 64 Council seats which must be covered by proportional representation were so distributed between Lombard provinces.

It must be underlined that this allocation is not fixed. Remained seats and votes after proportional distribution, are all grouped at regional level and divided by party lists. The consequent division of these seats at provincial level usually change the original apportionment. Only 37 seats were directly assigned at provincial level, and the final distribution between provinces changed in this way.

As it can be seen, the Province of Sondrio remained without representation.

Parties and candidates

Results
2005 election led to the return to the guide of the Region, for its third consecutive term, Communion and Liberation's Roberto Formigoni, supported by the center-right coalition.

If the mechanisms of electoral law generated a Regional Council very similar to the incumbent one, popular vote marked a significant reduction in the gap between the two sides, which was almost halved. The same plurality party, Forza Italia, decreased of more than four hundred preferences. The election was also the test for a list that led, within two years, to the national foundation of a new political entity, the Democratic Party.

The Olive Tree, an alliance comprising The Daisy and the Democrats of the Left, was the largest party in the region for the first time with the 27.1% of votes.

Results by province

Results by capital city

References

Regional elections in Lombardy
2005 elections in Italy